Turkey Weightlifting Federation (THF) is the governing body for weightlifting in Turkey. It aims to govern, encourage and develop the sport for all throughout the country.

History
THF has been established in 1956. First president of the THF was Haşim Ekener. THF is a member of the European Weightlifting Federation (EWF).

The federation organizes the national weightlifting events, and European and World championships hosted by Turkey.

International achievements

Olympics

World Championships

European Championships

Notable weightlifters
Men
 Naim Süleymanoğlu, triple Olympic, seven-times world and seven-times European champion
 Halil Mutlu, triple Olympic, five-times world and nine-times European champion
 Taner Sağır, Olympic, world and twice European champion
 Hafız Süleymanoğlu, world and triple European champion
 Fedail Güler, world and European champion
 Mete Binay, world champion
 Sedat Artuç, twice European champion
 Erol Bilgin, twice European champion
 Bünyamin Sezer, twice European champion
 Ekrem Celil, twice European champion
 Sunay Bulut, twice European champion
 Daniyar İsmayilov, twice European champion
 Muhammed Furkan Özbek, twice European champion
 İzzet İnce, European champion
 Semih Yağcı, European champion
 Hakan Yılmaz, European champion
 Ergün Batmaz, European champion

Women
 Nurcan Taylan, Olympic, triple European champion
 Sibel Özkan, World, twice European champion
 Şaziye Erdoğan, World, twice European champion
 Aylin Daşdelen, four-times European champion
 Sibel Şimşek, four times European champion
 Şule Şahbaz, European champion
 Emine Bilgin, European champion
 Ayşegül Çoban, European champion

International championships hosted in Turkey
 1994 World Weightlifting Championships, November 17–27,Istanbul
 2001 World Weightlifting Championships, November 4–11, Ankara
 2002 European Weightlifting Championships, Antalya
 2010 World Weightlifting Championships, September 17–26, Antalya
 2012 European Weightlifting Championships, April 9–15, Antalya
 Weightlifting at the 2013 Mediterranean Games, June 21–26, Mersin
 Weightlifting at the 2021 Islamic Solidarity Games, August 11–15, Konya

External links
  

Turkey
Federation
Weightlifting
Organizations based in Ankara
Sports organizations established in 1956
1956 establishments in Turkey